Ministry of Health & Family Welfare is a government ministry of the Indian state of Tripura.

References

External links
Official site

Government of Tripura
Tripura